The 1997 WNBL season was the 17th season of competition since its establishment in 1981. A total of nine teams contested the league.

Regular season

Ladder

Finals

Season awards

Statistical leaders

References

1997
1997 in Australian basketball
Aus
basketball